Sarah, Plain and Tall is a 1991 Hallmark Hall of Fame made-for-television drama film. It first aired on February 3, 1991. It is the first of three installments in the film adaptation of Patricia MacLachlan's novel of the same name. Location shots were filmed in Grand Island, Nebraska; Wichita, Kansas; near Melvern, Kansas; and in Maine.

Plot
The story is set in Kansas in 1910. Jacob Witting is a widowed farmer who is still saddened by the death of his wife, Katherine, during childbirth around six years before. Since her death, the task of taking care of his farm and two children, Anna and Caleb, is too difficult to handle alone. He advertises in the newspaper for a mail-order bride. Sarah Wheaton, from Maine, responds describing herself as "plain and tall". She travels to Kansas to become his wife.

Upon arriving, she proves to have good sense, an interest in helping with even the most physically demanding chores, and a quiet, warm personality. But she grows homesick: miles and miles of Kansas farmland prove no substitute for Maine's ocean vistas. She is under no obligation to marry Jacob and is free to leave if she so desires; much of the story's suspense depends on whether or not she will decide to stay.

Cast
 Glenn Close as Sarah Wheaton
 Christopher Walken as Jacob Witting
 Lexi Randall as Anna Witting
Christopher Bell as Caleb Witting
 Malgorzata Zajaczkowska as Maggie Grant (as Margaret Sophie Stein)
 Jon De Vries as Matthew Grant
 James Rebhorn as William Wheaton
 Woody Watson as Jess Stearns
 Betty Laird as Mrs. Parkley
 Marc Penney as Ticket Agent
 Kara Beth Taylor as Rose

Reception
Generally well received by the public, the film was considered "Fresh" at Rotten Tomatoes with 80% approval based on five reviews. It was nominated for nine Emmys in 1991, and it won one, for "Outstanding Editing for a Miniseries or a Special - Single Camera Production". It was also nominated for two Golden Globes.

Sequels
The film was followed by two sequels:
 Skylark (1993)
 Sarah, Plain and Tall: Winter's End (1999)

External links
 
 

1991 television films
1991 films
1991 drama films
Films set in 1910
Films based on children's books
Hallmark Hall of Fame episodes
Films directed by Glenn Jordan
Films set in Kansas
Films shot in Kansas
Films shot in Nebraska
Films based on American novels
American drama television films
1990s American films
Films with screenplays by Carol Sobieski